Justice Hill (born November 14, 1997) is an American football running back for the Baltimore Ravens of the National Football League (NFL). He played college football at Oklahoma State and was drafted by the Ravens in the fourth round of the 2019 NFL Draft.

Early years
Hill was a three-star player out of Booker T. Washington High School that signed with Oklahoma State. He was an Oklahoma All-State selection and was the 6A-II Offensive Player of the Year as a senior. He had offers from Houston, Louisville, and Oklahoma State. He rushed for 3,364 yards in high school and averaged 8.1 yards per carry and scored 54 touchdowns, 32 of which came his senior season.

College career
As a true freshman at Oklahoma State in 2016, Hill started the season as a backup. By the start of Big 12 play Hill started to heat up with 122 yard and his first career touchdown against Baylor. By the end of the season he had 7 games of 99 rushing yards or more. He received both Big 12 and National accolades, with Big 12 Newcomer of the Year and Freshman All-American honors. He was the leading returning rusher in the Big 12 entering the 2017 season.  On December 3, 2018, Hill announced that he would forgo his senior year of eligibility and declare for the 2019 NFL Draft.

College statistics

Professional career

Hill performed very well in the 2019 NFL Combine, showing good speed and strength. He had the fastest 40-yard dash time for all running backs, as well as the best vertical and broad jump.

Baltimore Ravens
Hill was drafted by the Baltimore Ravens in the fourth round, 113th overall, of the 2019 NFL Draft. The Ravens had acquired the pick in a trade that sent quarterback Joe Flacco to the Denver Broncos. In Week 1 of the 2019 season, he made his NFL debut in the Ravens' 59–10 victory over the Miami Dolphins. He had seven carries for 27 yards. In his rookie season, Hill finished with 225 rushing yards and two rushing touchdowns.

On September 6, 2021, Hill tore his achilles, prematurely ending his season. He was placed on injured reserve on September 8, 2021.

On March 17, 2023, Hill signed a two-year contract extension with the Ravens.

Personal
His brother, Daxton Hill, was drafted by the Cincinnati Bengals in the first round of the 2022 NFL Draft.

References

External links
Baltimore Ravens bio
Oklahoma State Cowboys bio

1997 births
Living people
Players of American football from Oklahoma
Sportspeople from Tulsa, Oklahoma
American football running backs
Oklahoma State Cowboys football players
Baltimore Ravens players
African-American players of American football
21st-century African-American sportspeople